Dravlaus is a village in the municipality of Volda in Møre og Romsdal county, Norway. The Dravlausdalen valley runs west from Dravlaus, along the Dravlauselva river. Dalsfjord Church is located in Dravlaus, along the shore of the fjord.

The Dalsfjord Lighthouse Museum is located in Dravlaus.

References

Villages in Møre og Romsdal
Volda